Ionthas ataracta is a moth of the subfamily Arctiinae first described by George Hampson in 1914. It is found in Queensland, Australia.

References

Moths described in 1914
Lithosiini